The 1906–07 season was the 19th season of The Football League.

Final league tables
The tables below are reproduced here in the same form that they can be found at the RSSSF website and in Rothmans Book of Football League Records 1888–89 to 1978–79, with home and away statistics separated.

First Division

Results

Maps

Second Division

Results

Maps

See also
1906–07 in English football
1906 in association football
1907 in association football

Footnotes

References

English Football League seasons
1

es:Anexo:1906-07 en el fútbol de Inglaterra
pl:Piłka nożna w Anglii (1906/1907)